The 1921–22 Prima Categoria season was won by Novese.

During the Summer of 1921, a dispute between the Federazione Italiana Giuoco Calcio (FIGC) and the strongest teams within the league arose. The teams asked for a reduction of the number of participants in the 1a Divisione.

Vittorio Pozzo developed a plan to accommodate the teams' requests, however, after a vote the plan was not passed; the smaller clubs feared that they would disappear if such a reduction was introduced.

This led to the creation of a new Italian football federation, the CCI (Confederazione Calcistica Italiana), that organized a championship concurrent to the FIGC championship.

This separation, however, only lasted one season and the following summer FIGC accepted a reduction in the league participants.

The 1921-22 FIGC winner was U.S. Novese.

Regulation
Tuscany was added to the main championship as the sixth region. The regional FAs remained with 48 clubs. The preliminary regional phase was the bulk of the tournament, with even twelve matchdays and regular regional football champions, while the following national phase was reduced to a spring tournament of two little groups and a final.

The main tournament was completely divided in six independent sections, and each region had its own football champions that joined the national championship.

Teams
Consequently to the controversy with the secessionist clubs, the Regional FAs quite respected the promotion rules. Only two clubs were added to the six rightful winners of the lower secondary regional tournaments.

Qualifications

Piedmont

Classification

Results table

Liguria

Classification

Results table

Lombardy

Group A
Classification

Results table

Group B
Classification

Results table

Group C
Classification

Results table

Group D
Classification

Results table

Final round
Classification

Results table

Veneto

Classification

Results table

Emilia

Group A
Classification

Results table

Group B
Classification

Results table

Qualification playoff
Played on 8 January 1922.

Tie-breaker
Played on 15 January 1922 in Bologna.

Relegation playoff
Played on 22 and 29 January 1922.

Since the aggregate rule wasn't applied, a tie-breaker was needed.

Tie-breaker
Played on 5 February 1922 in Ferrara.

Final round
Classification

Results table

Tuscany

Classification

Results table

Semifinals

Group A

Classification

Results table

Group B

Classification

Results table

Qualification playoff 
Played on April 30, 1922, in Milan.

National Finals
Played on May 7 and 14, 1922.

Repetition
Played on May 21, 1922, in Cremona.

References and sources
Almanacco Illustrato del Calcio - La Storia 1898-2004, Panini Edizioni, Modena, September 2005

Qualifications to the Northern League
This FIGC was very poor, and risks of a general bankruptcy was real. The FIGC had a sole resource, its FIFA membership, during the talks that started with the Northern League.

The rich League proposed that FIGC’s Prima Categoria became the Second Division of its CCI’s championship. An agreement was found in late June: the Colombo Compromise by the boss of newspaper La Gazzetta dello Sport.

The League imposed its idea of a 24 clubs First Division and a 48 clubs Second Division from 1923. The FIGC obtained a special 36 clubs championship for 1922-23, including champions and runner-ups of the disbanded Regional FAs. More, a third club of each regional FA could test its strength against a League bottom club.

To respect as possible its clubs, the FIGC decided a test-match between the third and the forth clubs of each region. All other clubs went directly to Division Two.

Played on July 2, 1922.

Barrage 
On mid-July Sundays, the six FIGC’s qualification winners could try to match the Northern League’s six bottom clubs.
Home/away matches on July 9 and 16.

(*) Since the away goal rule wasn't applied, a tie-break was needed:

Played on July 23, 1922, in Piacenza.

Rivarolese and Pastore Turin were the sole two FIGC clubs which joined the regional champions and runners-up in the new First Division.

Footnotes

 
1922a